In the 1863 Iowa State Senate elections, Iowa voters elected state senators to serve in the tenth Iowa General Assembly. Following the downsizing of the Iowa Senate from 49 to 46 seats in 1863, elections were held for 34 of the state senate's 46 seats. State senators serve four-year terms in the Iowa State Senate.

The general election took place in 1863.

Following the previous election in 1861, Republicans had control of the Iowa Senate with 33 seats to Democrats' 16 seats. However, three changes occurred during the ninth general assembly. In the third district, Democratic Senator Cyrus Bussey resigned on January 18, 1862, causing a vacancy in his seat. Democrat James Pollard succeeded Senator Bussey, holding the seat for the Democrats. In the sixth district, Republican Senator James Conrad Hagans died on September 7, 1863, causing a vacancy in his seat. The sixth district seat was left vacant until the next election. In the forty-first district, Republican Senator John Scott resigned on January 18, 1862, causing a vacancy in his seat. Democrat Edwin B. Potter succeeded Senator Scott, flipping the seat to Democratic control. Therefore, by election day in 1863, the Republicans held 31 seats, the Democrats held 17 seats, and one seat was vacant (the seat that had been held by Republican Senator Hagans).

To claim control of the chamber from Republicans, the Democrats needed to net seven Senate seats.

Republicans maintained control of the Iowa State Senate following the election with the balance of power shifting to Republicans holding 41 seats and Democrats having five seats (a net gain of 10 seats for Republicans).

Summary of Results 
 Note: The holdover Senators not up for re-election are not listed on this table.

Source:

Detailed Results
NOTE: The Iowa General Assembly does not provide detailed vote totals for Iowa State Senate elections in 1863.

See also
 Elections in Iowa

External links
District boundaries were redrawn before the 1863 general election for the Iowa Senate:
Iowa Senate Districts 1862-1863 map
Iowa Senate Districts 1864-1865 map

References

Iowa Senate
Iowa
Iowa Senate elections